Surfonic Water Revival is a various artists compilation album which was recorded and released in 1998 by KMG Records. The album pays tribute to the pioneers of Surf music like Brian Wilson, Jan and Dean, the Belairs, the Hondells, the Surfaris, the Ventures, Beach Boys, Dick Dale and many others.

The album was produced by Terry Scott Taylor who also wrote the majority of the songs which were all recorded exclusively for this album. Nearly every track on the album teams up multiple artists or bands who then join forces to deliver their best tribute to the genre. In some cases, the artists attempt to mix other styles of music with surf music, such as The Insyderz on "A Good Sailor Knows," where the artists attempt to blend their own style of Ska music with Surf. The overall result, according to CCM Magazine, was a sound more like a "unified record" than a compilation.

In 1999 the album was nominated for the Dove Award in the "Special Event Album of the Year" category.

The album was dedicated to Carl Wilson.

Track listing, composers and artists
 "Wave Perfect" (Taylor) – Smalltown Poets with Paul Johnson 
 "California Blue" (Taylor) – Brother's Keeper with Phil Keaggy 
 "A Good Sailor Knows" (Taylor) – The Insyderz
 "Endless Summer (Part 2)" (Taylor) – Chuck Girard with Paul Johnson
 "Surfer Girl Replies" (Taylor) – Plumb
 "Into the Deep" (Taylor) – Terry Scott Taylor (dedicated to Kerry Livgren) 
 "Thrill Seeker" (Taylor) – Plankeye
 "The Sun Comes Down Again" (Taylor) – Randy Stonehill with Havalina Rail Co.
 "Pay For Surf" (Taylor) – Daniel Amos
 "Gold Coast" (Altizer/Liles/Krippayne/Siler) – Rebecca St. James
 "Sister Mariana Trench" (Taylor) – Silage
 "Surfer's Paradise" (Taylor) – All Star United with Phil Keaggy
 "Oyster" (Altizer/Liles) – Rick Altizer
 "Last Day of Summer" (Altizer/Liles) – Skillet
 "Caught Inside" (Morginsky/Terusa/Carson) – The O.C. Supertones
 "The Net" (taylor) – Lost Dogs with Rich Young Ruler
 "Wave Perfect (Instrumental)" – Paul Johnson on lead guitar

Personnel
 Andy Prickett: Guitars
 Dave Raven: Drums
 Tim Chandler: Bass Guitar
 Terry Scott Taylor: Guitars
 Steve Hindalong: Percussion
 Phil Madeira: Keyboards
 Ballum Rosedryol: Keyboards

Additional musicians
 Paul Johnson: Guitars on "Endless Summer (Part 2)" and "Wave Perfect"
 Phil Keaggy: Guitars on "Surfer's Paradise" and "California Blue"
 Jerry Chamberlain: Guitars on "Pay For Surf"
 Ed McTaggart: Drums on "Pay For Surf" and "Into The Deep"
 Mike Roe: Background Vocals and Guitars on "Surfer Girl Replies"
 Gene Eugene: Piano, Arp Synthesizer on "Into The Deep," Farfisa on "Pay For Surf." 
 Rick Altizer: Guitars and Percussion on "Gold Coast." All instruments and vocals on "Oyster." 
 James Gregory: Bass Guitar on "Gold Coast."
 Raymond Boyd: Drums on "Gold Coast." 
 Background vocals provided by: Terry Taylor, Frank Drennen, Wayne Everett, Rob Bender, and Mead Chesebro.

Production notes
 Produced by Terry Scott Taylor
 Executive Producer: Kent Songer
 Co-Executive Producer: David Bahnsen
 Recorded at The "Fabulous" Green Room in Huntington Beach, California, Frontpage Recorders in Glendale, Arizona, and "The Mission" in Nashville, Tennessee
 Recorded by Terry Taylor, Gene Eugene and Phil Madeira. 
 Mixed by Terry Taylor and Gene Eugene.

Additional production notes
 "Gold Coast" produced by Rick Altizer and Tedd T.
 recorded at Papa Goose Studios, Antenna Studios, Brentwood, Tennessee
 mixed by Julian Kindred. 
 "California Blue" recorded at Ardent Studios, Memphis, Tennessee.
 Engineered by Pete Matthews. 
 Vocals produced by Kevin Paige.
 "Wave Perfect" Vocals and overdubs recorded at Twelve Oaks Recording studios and Soundstage, Sayrna, California. 
 Engineered by Randy Bugg. 
 Vocals produced by Michael Gleason.
 "Last Day of Summer" produced by Skidd Mills and Skillet. 
 recorded at Ardent Studios, Memphis, Tennessee. 
 engineered by Skidd Mills
 assistant engineer: Brad Blackwood
 "Oyster" recorded and mixed at Papa Goose Studios, Nashville, Tennessee.
 Engineered and produced by Rick Altizer.
 "Caught Inside" recorded at West Beach Studios, Hollywood, California.
 Produced by Steve Kravac.
 Mixed at A&M Studios.

References

1998 compilation albums
Christian music compilation albums
Surf compilation albums